The Great Southern and Western Railway (GS&WR) Class 47 consisted of twenty  locomotives designed by Alexander McDonnell and introduced from 1883.  They were intended for branch lines around Cork and for Dublin—Kildare and Dublin-Kilkenny services.

Class 47 was preceded by four members of class 28 introduced from about 1879, these having a slightly longer wheelbase.  Only one of class 28 remaining into GSR service when it was renumbered 40 and included in GSR Class 47. This was the 100th locomotive built under the Alexander McDonnell period and was temporarily numbered 100 when new.

Model
There is a detailed O Gauge model of engine 47 in the Fry model railway collection.

References

0-4-4BT locomotives
5 ft 3 in gauge locomotives
Railway locomotives introduced in 1883
Steam locomotives of Ireland
Scrapped locomotives